Baron Clifford is a title in the Peerage of England created by writ of summons on 17 February 1628 for Henry Clifford, Lord Clifford (so styled as heir to the Earldom of Cumberland). The title was believed to be held by Lord Clifford's father and descending to Lord Clifford via a writ of acceleration, but it would later be determined that the Clifford title held by that family had passed to a female relative, so the summons of 1628 unintentionally created a new title. Lord Clifford inherited his father's title in 1641, whereupon he sat in the House of Lords as Earl of Cumberland until his death in 1643.

His daughter Lady Elizabeth Clifford succeeded to the title suo jure (although, as was customary in those days, she never made claim to it). Lady Elizabeth had married, in 1634, the Hon. Richard Boyle (later Viscount Boyle) who was also created in 1644 Baron Clifford of Lanesborough in the Peerage of England with a seat in the House of Lords.

The Clifford barony of 1628 creation remained with the Earls of Burlington and Cork until the death of the 3rd and last Earl of Burlington in 1753, when that earldom and the Clifford of Lanesborough barony (i.e. the 1644 creation) became extinct.

This Clifford peerage then devolved upon Charlotte Cavendish, Marchioness of Hartington, wife of the future 4th Duke of Devonshire. Then the barony of Clifford was held by the Dukes of Devonshire until the death of William Cavendish, 6th Duke of Devonshire in 1858, since when it has been in abeyance.

Barons Clifford (1628)
Henry Clifford 1st Baron Clifford, 5th Earl of Cumberland (1591–1643) summoned to Parliament as Lord Clifford in 1628; succeeded to the earldom in 1641
Elizabeth, Countess of Burlington and 2nd Baroness Clifford (1613–1691)
Charles Boyle, 3rd Viscount Dungarvan, 3rd Baron Clifford (1639–1694)
Charles Boyle, 4th Baron Clifford, 2nd Earl of Burlington, 3rd Earl of Cork (1660–1704)
Richard Boyle, 5th Baron Clifford, 3rd Earl of Burlington, 4th Earl of Cork (1694–1753)
Charlotte Elizabeth Cavendish, 6th Baroness Clifford (1731–1754)
William Cavendish, 7th Baron Clifford, 5th Duke of Devonshire (1748–1811)
William Spencer Cavendish, 8th Baron Clifford, 6th Duke of Devonshire (1790–1858), upon whose death in 1858 the barony became abeyant

Current senior co-heirs to the barony include the Earl Granville and the Earl of Carlisle.

See also
Duke of Devonshire
Earl of Cumberland
Earl of Cork
Earl of Burlington

References

External links
 Burke's Peerage

1628 establishments in England
Baronies by writ
Baronies created by error
Clifford
Peerages created for eldest sons of peers
Abeyant baronies in the Peerage of England
Noble titles created in 1628